Cassandra, also spelt Kassandra, is a feminine given name of Greek origin. Cassander is the masculine form of Cassandra. In Greek mythology, Cassandra (Greek: Κασσάνδρα) was the daughter of King Priam and Queen Hecuba of Troy. She had the gift of prophecy, but was cursed so that none would believe her prophecies. 

The name peaked in popularity in the United States in 1990 with over 7000 girls named Cassandra born that year; the name is now rarer in the United States for babies, with only about 493 American girls called Cassandra in 2021. It is a common name in Greece and countries where Germanic and Romance languages are spoken.

People 
Cassandra Austen (1773–1845), English artist and elder sister of Jane Austen
Cassandra Bankson (born 1992), American model, student and YouTube personality
Cassandre Berdoz, Swiss event manager and Watchman of Lausanne Cathedral
Cassie Bernall (1981–1999), victim of the Columbine High School massacre
Cassandra Clare (born 1973), American author
Cassandra Pickett Durham (1824–1885), American physician and the first woman to earn a medical degree in the state of Georgia
Cassandra Fairbanks (born 1985), American journalist and activist
Cassie Jaye (born 1986), American actress and film director, known for the movie The Red Pill
Cassandra Jean (born 1985), American actress, model, and beauty pageant queen 
Cassandra Kelly, Australian company director
Cassandra Kelly (athlete) (born 1963), athlete from New Zealand
Cassandra Lee Morris (born 1982), American voice actress
Cassie Lewis (born 1974), Papua New Guinea born Australian poet, long time US resident
Cassandra Lynn (1979–2014), American model
Cassy O'Connor (born 1967), Australian politician
Cassandra Peterson (born 1951), American actress
Cassandra Ponti (born 1982), Filipino TV contestant
Cassandra Potter (born 1981), American curler
Cassie Scerbo (born 1990), American actress, singer and dancer
Cassie Steele (born 1989), Canadian actress
Cassandra Steen (born 1980), German singer
Cassandra Tate (born 1990), American athlete
Cassandra Thorburn (born 1971), Australian children's author
Cassandra Trenary, American ballet dancer
Cassie Ventura (born 1986), American singer
Cassandra Whitehead (born 1985), American model and beauty pageant titleholder
Cassandra Williams, Dominican politician
Cassandra Wilson (born 1955), American jazz singer
Regina Cassandra (born 1990), Indian actress

Fictional characters
Cassandra, one of the Jellicle cats in the musical Cats
Cassandra (Cassy), from the Canadian cartoon series Ultimate Book of Spells
Cassandra, from the American animated television series Tangled: The Series
Cassandra (Doctor Who), from the British science fiction television series 
Cassandra (Encantadia), in Etheria 
Cassandra (Stargate), in the American science fiction television series Stargate
Cassie Ainsworth, in the television series Skins
Cassandra Alexandra, Grecian character from the Soul series of fighting games
Cassie Cage, Mortal Kombat character
Cassandra Cain, one of the Batgirls in the DC Comics Universe
Cassandra Cooper, adoptive daughter of the Ingalls family on the show Little House on the Prairie
Cassandra Foster, on the American soap opera All My Children
Cassandra Freedman, on the Australian soap opera Neighbours
Cassie Hack, in the Hack/Slash comic books
Cassandra "Casey" Jones, a character in the Rise of the Teenage Mutant Ninja Turtles
Cassandra Lang, in the Marvel Comics universe
Cassandra Mortmain, narrator of Dodie Smith's 1948 novel I Capture the Castle
Cassandra Nova, Marvel supervillainess and the archenemy of Charles Xavier
Cassie Palmer, in the Cassandra Palmer novel series
Cassandra Pentaghast, in the Dragon Age franchise
Cassandra "Cassie" Railly, a main character in the television series 12 Monkeys
Cassandra Rawlins, from the American soap opera The Young and the Restless
Wonder Girl (Cassie Sandsmark), the current Wonder Girl in the DC Comics Universe
Cassandra Spender, Patient X from The X-Files
Cassandra Trelawney, ancestor of Sybill Trelawney, a character in the Harry Potter series
Cassandra Trotter, from the British sitcom Only Fools and Horses
Cassie Turner, on the Australian soap opera Home and Away
Cassie Layne Winslow, from the American daytime soap opera Guiding Light
Kassandra, a playable character in Assassin's Creed Odyssey
Cassandra "Cassie" Salazar, in the Netflix original Purple Hearts

References

Feminine given names